Silverado Vineyards is located east of Yountville, California in the Stags Leap District of Napa Valley.

History 
Ron and Diane Miller purchased the land with existing vineyards in the mid-1970s. Although the Millers' original intention was to only grow grapes, they began construction of their own winery on the property in 1981. Architect Dick Keith designed the old California mission style structure, which is often mistaken for an actual restoration. 

The winery has acquired a total of seven family owned vineyards located in various districts throughout the Valley. Silverado produces Sauvignon blanc, Chardonnay, Merlot, Sangiovese and Cabernet Sauvignon.The previous owners of the vineyard were the See family of See's Candies.

In July 2022, Silverado Vineyards was acquired by Foley Family Wines, with an estimated purchase price of over $150 million.

See also
List of celebrities who own wineries and vineyards

References

External links
 

Wineries in Napa Valley
Companies based in Napa County, California